Alexander Os (born 21 January 1980) is a former Norwegian biathlete.

Os announced his retirement after the end of the 2015–16 season.

Biathlon results
All results are sourced from the International Biathlon Union.

Olympic Games

World Championships

2 medals (1 gold, 1 bronze)

*During Olympic seasons competitions are only held for those events not included in the Olympic program.

References

External links
 
 

1980 births
Living people
People from Fauske
Norwegian male biathletes
Biathletes at the 2010 Winter Olympics
Olympic biathletes of Norway
Biathlon World Championships medalists
Sportspeople from Nordland